Kent Härstedt (born 29 January 1965, in Helsingborg) is a Swedish social democratic politician, member of the Riksdag from 1998 to 2018.

Actively interested in politics since the age of 16, he was elected to the municipal council of Helsingborg, where he remained for six years. He worked as political adviser to vice foreign minister Pierre Schori between 1994 and 1996, and as a freelance writer for amongst others Svenska Dagbladet, Helsingborgs Dagblad, and Arbetarbladet. In 1998 he was elected to the Riksdag and remained until  2018. In 2004 and 2005, he was also alcohol commissioner for the Swedish government. Härstedt is the elected vice President of the OSCE Parliamentary Assembly 2014–2017. At the election to Ukraine's parliament on 26 October 2014, Härstedt was the special coordinator for the OSCE observer mission. Hästedt was the OSCE special coordinator in the presidential elections in Belarus 2015 and in the parliamentary elections on 26 October 2016. He is since 2015 the chaIr of the OSCE PAs ad hoc working group on Belarus. Since 2017 Härstedt is chairman of Forum Syd, the largest Swedish NGO in support of civil society.

Between 1999 and 2005, he was the chairman of the Swedish branch of UNICEF.

Härstedt is a survivor of the  disaster in 1994.

References

External links
 Riksdagen: Kent Härstedt (s)
 Kent Härstedt – www.socialdemokraterna.se
 Kent Härstedt (personal homepage)

People from Helsingborg
1965 births
Living people
Members of the Riksdag from the Social Democrats
Members of the Riksdag 2002–2006
Shipwreck survivors